Benyamin Cohen (born 1975) is an American journalist and author. He is the author of the memoir My Jesus Year: A Rabbi's Son Wanders the Bible Belt in Search of His Own Faith published by HarperOne. Publishers Weekly named it one of the best books of the year for which Cohen received the Georgia Author of the Year Award. He was the founder and editor of the award-winning national magazine American Jewish Life and the online magazine Jewsweek, and he has written for the Huffington Post, the Daily Beast, the Washington Post, and Slate. Before that, he edited Torah from Dixie, thoughts on the weekly Bible portion, which was later turned into a book by the same name. He served as the content director for the Mother Nature Network, a science and environmental news website.

In 2014, he became the editorial director of the website "From The Grapevine". In 2018, he began hosting a weekly interview podcast, hosted on the Grapevine site, called "Our Friend from Israel". He is also the host of the "Hadassah on Call" podcast. In December 2020, it was announced that he became the News Director of The Forward.

Jewsweek
Jewsweek was an online magazine devoted to covering issues pertinent to young Jews in their 20s and 30s. It was created by Cohen in 2001. It covered a host of subjects, including topical events in the entertainment industry, political world, and within Judaism itself, both as it concerned the United States and Israel. In 2005 Cohen sold the company, which was subsequently reopened under Blue Star Media. Jewsweek ceased operation in 2007.

Book 
Cohen's book My Jesus Year: A Rabbi’s Son Wanders the Bible Belt in Search of Faith is part memoir, part spiritual quest, and part anthropologist's mission. In Cohen's book, he seeks to understand his lack of enthusiasm for Orthodox Judaism in addition to why Christians are so excited about Christianity. Among many adventures, he jumps into the mosh-pit at a Christian rock concert, sees himself on the JumboTron of a Black Baptist service, goes door-to-door with Mormon missionaries, attends a Christian wrestling event, and spends the day with some monks at a monastery. To Cohen's surprise, his search for universal answers and truths in the Bible Belt actually makes him a better Jew.

Cohen began work on a book about Albert Einstein in March 2021.

Bibliography 
My Jesus Year: A Rabbi’s Son Wanders the Bible Belt in Search of His Own Faith (HarperOne, 2008).

Torah from Dixie: Intriguing Thoughts on the Weekly Torah Portion (1998)

References

External links
Articles on the Forward
My Jesus Year Website
Benyamin Cohen's Website

Jewish American writers
American male non-fiction writers
1975 births
Living people
Writers from Atlanta
Jewish American journalists
21st-century American journalists
21st-century American Jews